Takum is a Local Government Area in Taraba State, Nigeria. Takum borders the Republic of Cameroon in the south, Ussa Local Government to the west, Donga Local government to the north, District within Takum are Angwan Dutse, Angwa Abuja, Tikari, Fadama, Gahwetun, Akenten, Acha Nyim, Chanchanji (Peva), Sufa, Shimta, Kufi, Muji, Akenten, Lufu, Kashimbilla, Kpaasan, Likam, Bete, Malumshe, Jidu, Tampwa, Dumse, Nyayirim, Barki Lissa,Acha Sarka, Sabon Gida Yukuben etc.

Major tribes are Kuteb, Ichen, Kpanzon, Tiv, Chamba and Hausa,
Takum is under the Traditional leadership of the Ukwe Takum dating back to the 16th century.

THE UKWE

The Ukwe is the Supreme Head of the Kutebland. In the proceeds of time as already ordain by KUTEB himself, this position is reserved for the Likam and Akente, which eventually appears that the value attached to seniority in Kuteb culture accounts for the retention of certain superiority by the Likam, and Akente the next most senior and neighbouring clan to Likam by being the source of the two royal families of Takum for the stool of Ukwe Takum. Even in modern Politics and Government, the seniority factor among the Kutebs still accounts for the need to consult the elders before final decisions are taken and acted upon.

Below is the list of Takum Traditional rulers since 1500 AD.

Takum
It has an area of 2,503 km and a population of 135,349 at the 2006 census.The postal code of the area is 671.

Languages
Takum is highly linguistically diverse, with more than a dozen distinct local languages (mostly Jukunoid languages and Southern Bantoid languages).

Kuteb language (Nigeria)|kuteb language]]

Hausa

Kpan language

Acha Language

Tiv language

References

Local Government Areas in Taraba State